Scott Elgin Reed (July 3, 1921 – February 17, 1994) was a justice of the Kentucky Supreme Court and a United States district judge of the United States District Court for the Eastern District of Kentucky.

Education and career

Born in Lexington, Kentucky, Reed received a Bachelor of Laws from the University of Kentucky College of Law in 1945. He was in private practice in Lexington from 1944 to 1964. He served as a judge first on the Fayette County Circuit Court, 1st Division, from 1964 to 1969, and then on the Kentucky Court of Appeals, 5th Appellate District, from 1969 to 1976. He was chief justice of the Supreme Court of Kentucky from 1976 to 1978, remaining on that court as an associate justice until 1979.

Federal judicial service

On August 28, 1979, Reed was nominated by President Jimmy Carter to a new seat on the United States District Court for the Eastern District of Kentucky created by 92 Stat. 1629. He was confirmed by the United States Senate on October 31, 1979, and received his commission on November 2, 1979. He assumed senior status due to a certified disability on August 1, 1988, serving in that capacity until his death, on February 17, 1994, in Lexington.

References

Sources
 

1921 births
1994 deaths
Judges of the Kentucky Court of Appeals
Justices of the Kentucky Supreme Court
Judges of the United States District Court for the Eastern District of Kentucky
United States district court judges appointed by Jimmy Carter
20th-century American judges
People from Lexington, Kentucky
University of Kentucky College of Law alumni
Chief Justices of the Kentucky Supreme Court